The following is the 2001–02 network television schedule for the six major English language commercial broadcast networks in the United States. The schedule covers primetime hours from September 2001 through August 2002. The schedule is followed by a list per network of returning series, new series, and series cancelled after the 2000–01 season. All times are Eastern and Pacific, with certain exceptions, such as Monday Night Football.

New fall series are highlighted in bold.

From February 8 to 24, 2002, all of NBC's primetime programming was preempted in favor of coverage of the 2002 Winter Olympics in Salt Lake City.

Each of the 30 highest-rated shows is listed with its rank and rating as determined by Nielsen Media Research.

 Yellow indicates the programs in the top 10 for the season.
 Cyan indicates the programs in the top 20 for the season.
 Magenta indicates the programs in the top 30 for the season.
Other Legend
 Light blue indicates local programming.
 Gray indicates encore programming.
 Blue-gray indicates news programming.
 Light green indicates sporting events.
 Light Purple indicates movies. 
 Red indicates series being burned off and other scheduled programs, including specials.

PBS is not included; member stations have local flexibility over most of their schedules and broadcast times for network shows may vary.

Impact of the September 11 attacks

During the week of September 11, 2001, the major television networks aired continuous news coverage of the September 11 attacks. The news coverage preempted the networks' primetime schedules between September 11 and September 15, with regular programming resuming on September 16. As a result of the preemptions, the programs that were set to begin airing new seasons in mid-September had their premieres delayed until late September and early October. The Amazing Race was the first program to premiere in the 2001–02 season; the show's first season premiered on September 5, but had its second episode postponed from September 12 to September 19 due to the aforementioned news coverage. As a result of the scheduling oddities that were necessitated by the news coverage, the 2001–02 season was the second of three instances where the start of the season was delayed due to issues outside of the control of the major television networks; the other instances were the 1988–89 season (due to the 1988 Writers Guild of America strike) and the 2020–21 season (due to a suspension of television productions as a result of the COVID-19 pandemic). The next major disruption to the primetime television schedules of the major television networks would not occur until the 2007–08 season, which was affected by the 2007–08 Writers Guild of America strike.

The 53rd Primetime Emmy Awards, which were planned for September 16, were initially postponed to October 7, but news coverage of the United States invasion of Afghanistan prompted the awards to be postponed for a second time; the awards would be eventually held on November 4.

Sunday 

NOTE: FOX aired 2 episodes of The Chamber in mid-January 2002. During the fall, Futurama and King of the Hill were preempted by overruns of NFL games. On The WB, Lost in the USA was supposed to air at 7–8, but it was cancelled due to 9/11 problems.

Monday 

Note: On ABC, The Runner was supposed to start when ESPN Monday Night Football concludes, but it was cancelled due to production problems.

Tuesday 

Note: Buffy the Vampire Slayer and Roswell moved to UPN from The WB this season.

Wednesday 

NOTE: When ABC announced their 2001 Fall Schedule, originally the plan was for The Job to air after The Drew Carey Show starting in mid-September and NYPD Blue would air in the 10pm ET timeslot after 20/20 Downtown returned to Friday nights in late December. However, after the terrorist attacks on September 11, 2001, ABC decided to not air The Job until mid-season because the show was set in New York City. In October, when the sitcom Bob Patterson was not doing well in the ratings on Tuesday nights, they moved the show to the Wednesday 9:30pm ET timeslot and put NYPD Blue in the Tuesday 9pm ET timeslot.

Thursday

Friday 

NOTE: Fox aired The Chamber on January 25, 2002, after two preview airings on past Sunday nights. The show was cancelled after its Friday night airing.

Saturday

By network

ABC

Returning series
20/20
America's Funniest Home Videos
Dharma & Greg
The Drew Carey Show
The Job
The Mole
Monday Night Football
My Wife and Kids
NYPD Blue
Once and Again
The Practice
Primetime Thursday
Spin City
The Wayne Brady Show
Who Wants to Be a Millionaire
Whose Line Is It Anyway?
The Wonderful World of Disney

New series
According to Jim
Alias
The Bachelor
Bob Patterson
The Chair *
The Court *
George Lopez *
Houston Medical *
Philly
Thieves
Wednesday 9:30 (8:30 Central) *
Widows *

Not returning from 2000–01:
The Beast
Dot Comedy
The Geena Davis Show
Gideon's Crossing
Madigan Men
Making the Band (revived and moved to MTV in 2002)
The Norm Show
The Trouble With Normal
Two Guys and a Girl
You Don't Know Jack

CBS

Returning series
48 Hours
60 Minutes
60 Minutes II
Becker
Big Brother
CBS Sunday Movie
CSI: Crime Scene Investigation
The District
Everybody Loves Raymond
Family Law
JAG
Judging Amy
The King of Queens
Survivor
That's Life
Touched by an Angel
Yes, Dear

New series
AFP: American Fighter Pilot *
The Amazing Race
The Agency
Baby Bob *
Citizen Baines
Danny
The Education of Max Bickford
The Ellen Show
First Monday *
The Guardian
Wolf Lake

Not returning from 2000–01:
Bette
Big Apple
Diagnosis: Murder
The Fugitive
Kate Brasher
Ladies Man
Nash Bridges
Some of My Best Friends
Walker, Texas Ranger
Welcome to New York

Fox

Returning series
Ally McBeal
America's Most Wanted: America Fights Back
Beyond Belief: Fact or Fiction
Boston Public
Cops
Dark Angel
Family Guy
FOX Night at the Movies
Futurama
Grounded for Life
Guinness World Records Primetime
King of the Hill
Malcolm in the Middle
That '70s Show
The Simpsons
Temptation Island
Titus
World's Wildest Police Videos
The X-Files

New series
24
30 Seconds to Fame *
The American Embassy *
American Idol *
Andy Richter Controls the Universe *
The Bernie Mac Show
The Chamber *
Greg the Bunny *
Love Cruise
Meet the Marks *
Pasadena
The Pulse *
That '80s Show *
The Tick
Undeclared

Not returning from 2000–01:
Boot Camp
FreakyLinks
The Lone Gunmen
Murder in Small Town X
Night Visions
Normal, Ohio
The Street

NBC

Returning series
Dateline NBC
Ed
ER
Fear Factor
Frasier
Friends
Just Shoot Me!
Law & Order
Law & Order: Special Victims Unit
Providence
Spy TV
Third Watch
Three Sisters
The Weakest Link
The West Wing
Will & Grace

New series
Crossing Jordan
Dog Eat Dog *
Emeril
Imagine That *
Inside Schwartz
Law & Order: Criminal Intent
Leap of Faith
Lost
Meet My Folks *
The Rerun Show *
Scrubs
UC: Undercover
Watching Ellie *

Not returning from 2000–01:
Cursed (renamed The Weber Show)
DAG
Daddio
Deadline
The Downer Channel
The Fighting Fitzgeralds
First Years
Go Fish
Kristin
The Michael Richards Show
3rd Rock from the Sun
Titans
Tucker

UPN

Returning series
Buffy the Vampire Slayer (moved from The WB)
Girlfriends
The Hughleys
The Parkers
Roswell (moved from The WB)
Special Unit 2
UPN's Night at the Movies
WWE SmackDown!

New series
As If *
One on One
The Random Years *
Star Trek: Enterprise
Under One Roof *

Not returning from 2000–01:
All Souls
Chains of Love
Freedom
Gary and Mike
Level 9
Manhunt
Moesha
Seven Days
Star Trek: Voyager

The WB

Returning series
7th Heaven
Angel
Charmed
Dawson’s Creek
Felicity
Flix From the Frog
For Your Love
Gilmore Girls
Nikki
Popstars USA
Ripley's Believe It or Not!
Sabrina the Teenage Witch
The Steve Harvey Show

New series
Elimidate Deluxe
Glory Days *
The Jamie Kennedy Experiment *
Maybe It's Me
Men, Women & Dogs
My Guide to Becoming a Rock Star *
Off Centre
Raising Dad
Reba
Smallville

Not returning from 2000–01:
Buffy the Vampire Slayer (moved to UPN)
Grosse Pointe
Hype
Jack & Jill
The Jamie Foxx Show
The Oblongs
The PJs
Popular
Roswell (moved to UPN)

Note: The * indicates that the program was introduced in midseason.

References 

United States primetime network television schedules
2001 in American television
2002 in American television
Impact of the September 11 attacks on television